Robert Keith McKean  was a Canadian Anglican priest in the second half of the 20th century.
McKean was educated at the University of Manitoba. Ordained in 1961,  his first post was a curacy at st Aidan, Winnipeg. He was Rector of St Alban, Winnipeg from 1962 to 1965; All Saints, Peterborough, Ontario from 1965. He was              Archdeacon of Peterborough from 1974.

References

University of Toronto alumni
Archdeacons of Peterborough, ON
20th-century Canadian Anglican priests